Zamug of Kish was the eighteenth Sumerian king in the First Dynasty of Kish, according to the Sumerian king list. His father was Barsal-nuna, whom he succeeded as ruler. His name does not appear in other documents than the SKL, meaning that it is unlikely that he was a historical person.

References 

|-

29th-century BC Sumerian kings
Kings of Kish
Sumerian kings